New York State Route 2A was the former name of several sections of highway in New York State:

 New York State Route 11B
 New York State Route 15A
 New York State Route 96A